Massarina is a genus of fungi in the Massarinaceae family. The widespread genus contains about 125 species. Anamorph forms of species in Massarina include Acrocalymma, Ceratophoma, and Tetraploa. Massarina was circumscribed by Pier Andrea Saccardo in 1883.

The genus name of Massarina is in honour of Giuseppe Filippo Massara (1792-1839), who was an Italian doctor and botanist, working in Sondrio.

Species

Massarina albocarnis
Massarina alni
Massarina beaurivagea
Massarina berchemiae
Massarina bipolaris
Massarina brunaudii
Massarina capensis
Massarina carolinensis
Massarina cisti
Massarina clionina
Massarina constricta
Massarina contraria
Massarina cystophorae
Massarina eburnea
Massarina grandispora
Massarina igniaria
Massarina japonica
Massarina jasminicola
Massarina lacertensis
Massarina leucadendri
Massarina magniarundinacea
Massarina mauritiana
Massarina microcarpa
Massarina microspora
Massarina operculicola
Massarina pandanicola
Massarina phragmiticola
Massarina polytrichadelphi
Massarina ricifera
Massarina sanguineo-ostiolata
Massarina submediana
Massarina thalassiae
Massarina thalassioidea
Massarina tiliae
Massarina uniserialis
Massarina waikanaensis
Massarina walkeri

References

Pleosporales
Taxa named by Pier Andrea Saccardo
Taxa described in 1883